Granja Viana (commonly known as Granja, sometimes spelled as Granja Vianna) is an upscale district in the city of Cotia, São Paulo, Brazil. Officially, the district is located in the east side of the city, but some portions of southern Carapicuíba, northern Embu das Artes and eastern Jandira are often referred to as Granja Viana as well. It can be accessed via the Raposo Tavares Highway.

In Cotia itself, it occupies an area of 50 km2, with a population of 35,000(2014), and it possesses 70% of the city's industry, including automotive parts, food & beverage, metallurgy, graphic, informatics, serigraphy, chemicals, pottery, horticulture, woods, plastics, etc.

The district is part of the Transition Towns network, having a local community called "Transition Granja Viana".

History 
The lands today considered as "Granja Viana" belonged to the Carapicuyba Farm, which also consisted of areas from today's Osasco and Embu das Artes. The farm was later fragmented and divided between dozens of people, including Niso Vianna (who kept the farmer's name in his property); José Giorgi, owner of Fazenda Cabanas (or Moinho Velho); and Junqueira de Aquino family, owners of Fazendinha.

The main center of the farm was renamed Granja Vianna. Its owner, Niso Vianna, was a rotary member and a businessman in the field of fertilizers. He founded the Lar Rotary School (which would become the Colégio Rio Branco in 1982) and he helped to build the Santo Antônio Church (to which his wife Vanetty Vianna was devoted). The name "Granja" (which means a place were han and chicken are bred) came after Niso acquired more lands, imported cattle from foreign countries and started to dedicate himself to the production of milk and cheese. On 29 July 1959, the Sociedade Amigos da Vila de Santo Antônio de Carapicuíba was founded; it was replaced in 1980 by the Sociedade Amigos do Bairro da Granja Vianna.

Geographer Aziz Ab'Saber, who lived in the neighborhood, criticized in 1991 the way it developed:

In the late half of the 20th century, Granja became a dormitory for wealthy families of São Paulo, being filled with luxury condominiums. In the 21st century, it attracted companies and more people, becoming a high-density neighborhood, incompatible with its infrastructure.

Sites of interest 
Granja Viana is home to the Granja Viana International Kart Circuit. Another important site is the Zu Lai Temple, the largest Buddhist temple in Latin America.

Notable residents 
 Aziz Ab'Saber (geographer, deceased) 
 Eduardo Araújo (singer) 
 Vladmir Belitsky (Statistic professor at USP) 
 Sérgio Dias (musician)
 Marcelo Fromer (musician, deceased) 
 Alexandre Frota (actor, TV presenter) 
 Rita Lee (musician) 
 Negra Li (singer) 
 Fernando Meirelles (film director) 
 Perla (singer) 
 Jair Rodrigues (singer, deceased) and his children Luciana Mello, Jair Oliveira and the latter's wife Tania Khalill

Bibliography

References 
 History of Granja Viana

Neighbourhoods in São Paulo (state)